A by-election was held in the Dáil Éireann Carlow–Kilkenny constituency in Ireland on Friday, 22 May 2015, to fill the vacancy left by the resignation of Fine Gael Teachta Dála (TD) Phil Hogan on his appointment as European Commissioner. It was held on the same day as national referendums on marriage equality and the age of eligibility for election to the office of president. The Electoral (Amendment) Act 2011 stipulates that a by-election in Ireland must be held within six months of a vacancy occurring. The by-election writ was moved in the Dáil on 29 April 2015.

At the 2011 general election, the constituency elected three Fine Gael TDs, one Labour Party TD and one Fianna Fáil TD. In the May 2014 local elections, Carlow County Council elected 6 Fine Gael, 5 Fianna Fáil, 3 Sinn Féin, 2 Labour and 2 Independent Councillors, while Kilkenny County Council elected 10 Fianna Fáil, 7 Fine Gael, 3 Sinn Féin, 2 Labour, 1 Green Party and 1 Independent Councillor. Patrick McKee, who stood for Renua Ireland, had been elected to Kilkenny County Council for Fianna Fáil.

Former TD Bobby Aylward of Fianna Fáil won the by-election on the 9th count, having received 27.8% of the first-preference votes. Aylward had previously represented Carlow–Kilkenny from 2007 until 2011. The result marked the first by-election win for Fianna Fáil since 1996, and the first time they had gained a seat from Fine Gael in a by-election since the Donegal–Leitrim contest in 1970.

Result

See also
List of Dáil by-elections
Dáil constituencies

References

2015 in Irish politics
2015 elections in the Republic of Ireland
31st Dáil
By-elections in the Republic of Ireland
Elections in County Carlow
Elections in County Kilkenny
May 2015 events in Ireland